Kenneth Allen (born November 22, 1956) is an American former professional stock car racing driver in the Craftsman Truck Series. He earned one top ten finish in 41 career starts. Allen also raced in the ARCA Racing Series, where he finished 10th in points in 1993. In both series, he mostly drove for his family team, AAG Racing.

Racing career
Allen made his series debut in 1995 running nine races, in his own No. 65 Chevrolet. His first start came at the Milwaukee Mile, where he qualified 27th, but came home with a solid 15th-place finish. In the other eight starts, he would take on three more top-20 finishes, the best being a 13th at Indianapolis Raceway Park.

His best season came in 1996, where he made twenty of twenty-four races. In his return to Milwaukee, he finished tenth, his only career top-10, but had seven other top-20 finishes. However, Allen's big problem was DNFs. In his twenty starts, he did not finish eight of them.

After sponsor ONSAT left, Allen only made ten starts in 1997. His best finish was only a 15th at Miami, but he also earned his first career top-10 start. He started the Texas race in 7th position.

Allen would only make one start in 1998, when he drove the No. 82 Ford for Core Motorsports at Texas, where he started 35th and finished 28th due to a crash. After not running any Truck races in 1999, Allen returned in 2000 and started the season with a DNQ at Daytona. Allen's only other race of the season came at Homestead-Miami Speedway, where he did qualify for the race but finished last on the field after transmission trouble. Both of these starts came in the No. 28 Chevrolet for Jim Rosenblum Racing, where he would also fail to qualify for Daytona with them the next two years. He never made another attempt in the series after that.

Motorsports career results

NASCAR

Craftsman Truck Series

ARCA Bondo/Mar-Hyde Series
(key) (Bold – Pole position awarded by qualifying time. Italics – Pole position earned by points standings or practice time. * – Most laps led.)

References

External links
 

1956 births
NASCAR drivers
ARCA Menards Series drivers
People from Shelby, North Carolina
Racing drivers from North Carolina
Living people